The Desert Range is a mountain range in Clark County, Nevada.

Desert Range was descriptively named on account of its desert landscape.

References 

Mountain ranges of Clark County, Nevada
Mountain ranges of Nevada